Bark Your Head Off, Dog is the fourth studio album by American indie rock band Hop Along. It was self-produced, written over the course of 2016 and 2017, recorded at The Headroom in Philadelphia during 2017, and released on April 6, 2018.

Critical reception
Bark Your Head Off, Dog was met with "universal acclaim" reviews from critics. At Metacritic, which assigns a weighted average rating out of 100 to reviews from mainstream publications, this release received an average score of 81 based on 14 reviews. Aggregator Album of the Year gave the release a 79 out of 100 based on a critical consensus of 20 reviews.

Track listing

Charts

References

Further reading 

 https://www.guitarworld.com/artists/we-will-both-find-out-just-not-together-a-conversation-with-hop-along

2018 albums
Hop Along albums
Saddle Creek Records albums